Ged Simmons (born 1960 in Handsworth, Birmingham) is a British actor who played DI Alex Cullen in The Bill from 2000 to 2002. He has also been in Coronation Street, EastEnders, Bodyguards, Touching Evil, Holby City, Dream Team, The Rotters' Club, Doctors and Spooks.

He is also the author of a number of screenplays and theatrical works. His first novel, The Gravedigger's Story, was published by impbooks in April 2004.

He was elected President of the Student Union at his college in Walsall, West Midlands.

External links
 

English male soap opera actors
1960 births
Living people
People from Handsworth, West Midlands